Sat Sandarbhas (Six Sandarbhas) is a 16th-century Vaishnava Sanskrit text, authored by Gaudiya Vaishnava theologian Jiva Goswami. The six treatise are Tattva-, Bhagavat-, Paramatma-, Krishna-, Bhakti-, and Priti-sandarbha. Jiva's Krama-sandarbha commentary on the Bhagavata Purana is often described as the "seventh" of the six sandarbhas.

The Six Sandarbhas are sometimes called the Bhagavata-sandarbha, not to be confused with the second treatise titled Bhagavat-sandarbha. The word "sandarbha" literally means "weaving" or "arranging"; the Bhagavata-sandarbha, his main philosophical work, is a thematic arrangement of the Bhagavata Purana, which presents Caitanya Vaishnavism in a systematic and comprehensive way. Gupta places this composition as an early work due to references in latter works such as Radha-krsnarcana-dipika, Krama-sandarbha, Dig-darsini, Durgama-sangamini, and Gopalacampu. Brzezinski dates the composition between Jiva's Madhava-mahotsava in 1555 and published praises of Jiva in 1561.

According to Jiva Goswami, Gopala Bhatta Goswami had already done the preliminary work on Sat Sandarbhas, but did not complete it. Jiva took the work of Gopala Bhatta and expanded it into six parts, systematically presenting the philosophy of Chaitanya Mahaprabhu and providing scriptural evidences. Jiva Goswami also wrote an extensive commentary to the first four sandarbhas called Sarva-samvadini. The Jiva Institute of Dr. Satyanarayana Dasa based in Vrindavan is engaged in what Lucian Wong calls an "ambitious Sandarbha translation project".

Tattva-sandarbha 
Tattva-Sandarbha is a treatise on the various types of evidences (pramanas) used in Vedic philosophy, concluding that shabda (divine sound in the form of the Vedic scriptures) is the highest, and of all the scriptures, the Bhagavata Purana is the highest pointing to the Absolute Truth.

English translations by:
 Stuart Elkman (1986)
 Kusakratha dasa (1987)(2007)
 Satyanarayana Dasa and Kundali Dasa (1995)
 Bhanu Swami (2012)
 Gopiparanadhana Dasa (2013)
 Satyanarayana dasa (2015)

Hindi translations by:
 Haridas Shastri (along with commentaries by Jiva Goswami, Baladeva Vidyabhushan, Radha Mohan Goswami, and Gaura Kishor Goswami)
 Shyamlal Hakim (Shri Shyamdas)

Bhagavat-sandarbha 
Bhagavat-sandarbha distinguishes the impersonal aspect of Godhead (Brahman), the localized form of God within the heart of each living being (Paramatma), and the highest personal aspect of Godhead (Krishna or Bhagavan). Describes the spiritual realm of Krishna, the modes of material nature, the mode of pure goodness (visuddha-sattva), the importance of worshiping the deity of Krishna, and the eternal nature and qualities of the deity.

English translations by:
 Bhanu Swami (with commentary of Jiva Goswami)
 Satyanarayana dasa (with his own commentary)

Hindi translations by:
 Haridas Shastri
 Shyamlal Hakim (Shri Shyamdas)

Paramatma-sandarbha 
Paramatma-sandarbha describes the characteristics of Paramatma (supersoul), and how he resides in all living entities in the universe. Discusses the nature of the materially conditioned living entities, the phenomenal material world, the illusory potency (Maya), the theory of transformation, the various avatars of Krishna, how Krishna reciprocates with his devotees, and how Krishna is characterized by six particular opulences.

English translations by:
 Bhanu Swami (with commentary of Jiva Goswami)
 Satyanarayana dasa (with his own commentary)

Hindi translations by:
 Haridas Shastri
 Shyamlal Hakim

Krishna-sandarbha 
Krishna-sandarbha gives a number of quotes from various scriptures to prove that Krishna is the supreme god. Discusses the pastimes and qualities of Krishna as well as his avatars and functionary expansions. There is a description of Goloka, the planet of Krishna in relation to Vrindavana in the material sphere, the eternal associates of Krishna and their expansions, and a description of the Gopis and the topmost position of Radha among them.

English translations by:
 Bhanu Swami (with commentary of Jiva Goswami)
 Satyanarayana dasa (with his own commentary)

Hindi translations by:
 Haridas Shastri
 Shyamlal Hakim

Bhakti-sandarbha 
Bhakti-sandarbha explains how devotion to Krishna is directly executed, how the self is manifest through bhakti, the potency of imperfectly executed bhakti, the differences between a great and ordinary devotee, spontaneous love of god (raganuga-bhakti), the specific purpose of becoming a devotee of Krishna, and other perfectional stages. Discusses Varnashrama dharma (the socio-religious system established in scriptures), the superexcellent position of devotion to Krishna as compared to other conceptions such as yoga, and the worship of minor deities of the Hindu pantheon as being futile in comparison to the worship of Krishna's devotees. Explains liberation of the soul, the position of Shiva as a devotee of Krishna, how unmotivated devotion to Krishna promotes a devotee to the highest spiritual position and numerous other points concerning the performance of Vaishnava devotion.

English translations by:
 Bhanu Swami
 Satyanarayana Dasa and Bruce Martin

Hindi translations by:
 Haridas Shastri
 Shyamlal Hakim

Priti-sandarbha 
Priti-sandarbha is a treatise on divine love, the supreme object being Krishna, where love for God (prema) is considered the highest form of liberation. Presents a comparative study of other types of liberation, concluding Prema Bhakti as topmost. Discusses how to attain Prema, how to awaken it, and the symptoms of one who has attained it. Discusses the distinctions between mundane lust and divine love, the various mellows found among the associates of Krishna, the superexcellence of Madhurya-rasa (divine conjugal love), the overlapping of different rasas, and the glories of Radha.

English translations by:
 Bhanu Swami

Hindi translations by:
 Haridas Shastri
 Shyamlal Hakim

Notes

References

External links 
 Gaudiya Grantha Mandira (Sanskrit Texts)
 Sat Sandarbhas (Jiva Institute)

Sanskrit texts